HMS Bramble was launched in Bermuda in 1809. She had a relatively brief and uneventful career before the Royal Navy sold her in December 1815. She became the mercantile Bramble (or Bamble), and was last listed in 1824.

Career
Lieutenant John Fleming commissioned Bramble in August 1808 in Bermuda. In March 1813 Fleming commissioned , by which time Bramble was already under the command of Lieutenant Henry Freeman Young Pogson, who had assumed command on 26 August 1812. While under Pogson's command, Bramble was employed in carrying despatches to the coasts of Spain and North America.

On 1 November 1812 Bramble, Lieutenant Pogson, captured the Prussian brig De Twee Gebroeders, Joseph Dorman, master. 

On 4 March 1813 Bramble sent into Plymouth Habnab, Vibers, master, for a breach of the revenue laws. Habnab had been sailing from Bay Chaleurs to Corruna.

They were also in company on 15 April at the capture of the letter of marque Caroline.

On 7 May there was an auction of the cargo of the American vessel Hope, Benjamin Holbrook, master, which Bramble had captured coming into Corruna from Philadelphia. Hope had been sailing under a license issued by the British government and so the Admiralty Court in Plymouth restored her to her owners. However, her cargo had to be sold both to pay expenses and because she had arrived at Plymouth in a distressed state.

On 15 May Bramble brought into Plymouth Lord Wellington, bound for Guernsey, and coming from Gibraltar and Corunna.

In June 1814 Lieutenant Thomas Nichols assumed command of Bramble. 

On 28 June Count de Faironneye arrived at Fowey after Bramble had detained her. Count de Faironneye had been sailing from Guadeloupe.

On 7 July Bramble was off Madeira when she captured Triton, Menderema, master, which had been on her way to Havana or Guadeloupe from Bordeaux. Triton arrived at Fowey on 18 July. 

She was offered for auction in Plymouth on 3 May 1816.

Disposal: The "Principal Officers and Commissioners of His Majesty's Navy" offered "Bramble schooner, of 150 tons", "lying at Deptford", for sale on 14 December 1815. She sold on that day for £600.

Merchantman
Bamble [sic] appeared in Lloyd's Register LR) in 1816, as a barque. 

She was last listed in 1824, with unchanged data.

Notes, citations, and references
Notes

Citations

References
 
 

Shamrock-class schooners
1809 ships
Ships built in Bermuda
Schooners of the Royal Navy
Age of Sail merchant ships of England